Saint John the Theologian, Kaneo (Latinic: Sveti Jovan Kaneo) or simply Saint John at Kaneo is a Macedonian Orthodox church situated on the cliff over Kaneo Beach overlooking Lake Ohrid in the city of Ohrid, North Macedonia. The church is dedicated to John of Patmos, the writer of Revelation, who has been by some considered to be the same person as John the Apostle. The construction date of the church remains unknown but documents detailing the church property suggest that it was built before the year 1447. Archaeologists believe that the church was constructed some time before the rise of the Ottoman Empire very likely in the 13th century. Restoration work in 1964 led to the discovery of frescoes in its dome.

History

The church has a cruciform architectural plan, with a rectangular base. The architect of the church is unknown. Reconstruction work was carried out on the church in the 14th century, shortly before the arrival of Ottoman Turks in Macedonia. A wooden iconostasis was constructed within the church and by the 20th century numerous saints along with the Virgin Mary have been portrayed on the apse. A fresco of Christ Pantocrator can be seen on the dome of the church. A fresco of Saint Clement of Ohrid (whose monastery, Saint Panteleimon, is located close to the church) accompanied by Saint Erasmus of Ohrid can also be seen on a wall of the church.

Image gallery

References

External links

13th-century Eastern Orthodox church buildings
Archaeological sites in North Macedonia
Macedonian Orthodox churches
Medieval churches of Ohrid
Medieval Macedonia
Byzantine sacred architecture
Byzantine church buildings in North Macedonia
Archbishopric of Ohrid